Westfalenhallen (English: Halls of Westphalia) is a commercial complex composed of conference (Kongresszentrum Dortmund) and exhibition centers (Messe Dortmund) with an indoor arena (Westfalenhalle), located in Dortmund, Germany. It is surrounded by the Eissportzentrum Westfalenhallen, Stadion Rote Erde, Signal Iduna Park and Helmut-Körnig-Halle.

The original building was opened in 1925, but was destroyed during World War II. Reopening on 2 February 1952, new halls were built, the "Große Westfalenhalle". The "Kleine Westfalenhalle" served also for balls, exhibitions and concerts, such as the Dortmunder Philharmoniker, until the Opernhaus Dortmund was opened in 1966. The Bundesliga was founded at the Westfalenhallen in 1962.

Events
The venue played host to the 1964, 1980 and 2004 World Figure Skating Championships, as well as the 1955, 1983 and 1993 IIHF Ice Hockey World Championships tournaments.

Bob Marley and The Wailers performed on 13 June 1980 as part of their in support of their new release (1980 Uprising Album) at the venue.

Pink Floyd performed two concerts on 23 and 24 January 1977 as part of their In the Flesh Tour (1977 Pink Floyd 'Animals' tour) at the venue.

ABBA performed on 25 October 1979 as part of ABBA: The Tour at the venue.

In 1981, the venue was one of only four locations worldwide of The Wall Tour, by Pink Floyd, along with Los Angeles, Uniondale (New York) and London. They returned to perform three concerts on 27, 28 and 29 June 1988 as part of their A Momentary Lapse of Reason Tour.

In 1983, the venue hosted the Rock Pop Festival, featuring Iron Maiden (headliner band), Scorpions, Ozzy Osbourne, Def Leppard,  Quiet Riot, Judas Priest, Krokus and The Michael Schenker Group - one of the largest heavy metal lineups of all time, featuring these bands at the peak of their careers.

In November 1984, U2 played the venue, as part of the Unforgettable Fire Tour. The performance was recorded and can be found on YouTube.

Portions of Yes's 9012Live: The Solos live album which was released in 1985 were recorded at the venue.

In 1988, Prince broadcast a performance from the venue live via satellite across Europe, later releasing it on video.

In 1990, Madonna the most successful female artist performed on 17 July 1990 Blond Ambition Tour.

The Spice Girls performed at the venue on 1 April 1998, on the European Leg of the Spiceworld Tour.

Iron Maiden recorded Death on the Road, a live CD/DVD, at the venue on 24 November 2003.

Madonna performed a concert at the venue during the Blond Ambition World Tour in 1990.

Floor areas of Messe Westfalenhalle

Public transport 

 is officially a terminus station of the Dortmund Stadtbahn (urban rail) line U45 and U46, part of the Verkehrsverbund Rhein-Ruhr (VRR). Practically, it is not a terminus station: The trains of the line U46 continue as U45 to the central station, while the U45 trains usually continue as U46 to Brunnenstraße. In case of football matches of Borussia Dortmund or other events at Signal Iduna Park, the trains serve the terminus station Stadion.

External links

Kongresszentrum Dortmund

References 

               

Indoor arenas in Germany
Tourist attractions in North Rhine-Westphalia
Buildings and structures in Dortmund
Indoor ice hockey venues in Germany
Convention centres in Germany
Indoor track and field venues
Sports venues in North Rhine-Westphalia
Velodromes in Germany